Lago di Val di Noci is a lake in the Province of Genova, Liguria, Italy.

References 

Lakes of Liguria
Reservoirs in Italy